was a Japanese professional sumo wrestler. He was the sport's 13th yokozuna and the first to be promoted during the Meiji era.

Career
Kimenzan was born in Washizu District, Mino Province (now Yōrō, Gifu Prefecture). He was born to a family that ran a farm. A the time, wrestlers were appointed as vassals of feudal lords, having a status similar to that of a samurai as well as being the champions of the feudal domain to which they were linked. However,  because Jinmaku later switched to the Matsue Domain and then Satsuma Domain, it is said that Kimenzan and Jinmaku developed a strong rivalry which resulted in several "grudge matches".
He was promoted to ōzeki in November 1865. However, he was unenrolled in the November 1866 banzuke. It was reportedly because he had a quarrel with sumo elders. He was promoted to ōzeki again in June 1868. He was already 43 years old, making him the oldest yokozuna to be promoted in the history of sumo. Because of his age, he did not have a long career as a yokozuna, and retired from the ring only in November 1870. He was known for his strong offensive attack from a solid right-hand stance, but even when he established a solid position, his attack itself sometimes seemed forced, and thus he was often left behind. His record since his license was 17 wins, 3 losses, 2 draws, 14 holds. In the top makuuchi division, he won 143 bouts and lost 24 bouts, recording a winning percentage of 85.6. Because of his rank of yokozuna, he was given the privilege of being an ichidai-toshiyori under his shikona. He died on September 7, 1871, less than a year after his retirement, at the age of 46. His grave can be found in the in the Tokurin-ji temple, in his hometown of Yōrō, Gifu.

Homage
There is a monument to him in Yōrō, Gifu.

Top division record 
The actual time the tournaments were held during the year in this period often varied.

  
    
    
  
 
    
    
  

    
    
  

    
    
  

    
    
  

    
    
  

    
    
  

    
    
  

    
    
  

    
    
  

    
    
  

    
    
  

    
    
  

    
    

*Championships for the best record in a tournament were not recognized or awarded before the 1909 summer tournament and the above unofficial championships are historically conferred. For more information see yūshō.

See also
Glossary of sumo terms
List of past sumo wrestlers
List of yokozuna

References

External links

 Kimenzan Tanigoro tournament results

1826 births
1871 deaths
Japanese sumo wrestlers
Yokozuna
Sumo people from Gifu Prefecture
19th-century wrestlers